Alethea Jones is an Australian director, producer and actress. She is best known for her films Lemonade Stand (2012) and Fun Mom Dinner (2017), and the TV-series Queen America.

Career 
Jones's first short film, When the Wind Changes (which she directed and edited), premiered at the 2010 Melbourne International Film Festival and in 2011 won the prestigious Inside Film (IF) Award for Best Short Film as well as the Most Popular Film Award at Flickerfest and Best Comedy and People's Choice awards at the St Kilda Film Festival.

Her big break was directing the short film Lemonade Stand, which won first prize at the 2012 Tropfest Film Festival. Tropfest founder and director, John Polson said: "Lemonade Stand is an incredibly well made film and a favourite amongst the judges. There was intense discussion in the judging room, and some really interesting debates. Alethea should be very proud to have been selected by some of the industry’s greatest talent."

Her first feature film was Fun Mom Dinner, starring Toni Collette, Paul Rudd, Molly Shannon, Adam Scott, and Adam Levine. The film had its world premiere at the 2017 Sundance Film Festival,

In August 2017, it was announced that Jones would develop and direct the live action Barbie film, starring Anne Hathaway based on a script from Olivia Milch and produced by Sony. In January 2018, Sony lost the rights to the film and it moved across to Warner Brothers with Margot Robbie to star. A new creative team was assembled with the studio change and Hathaway, Jones and Milch did not go across for contractual reasons. Jones is also attached to direct the period musical Big Gay Jamboree, to be produced by LuckyChap Entertainment, from a script being written by Maria Mindelle and Jonathan Parks-Ramage. In October 2022, Jones was announced as the producer and first episode director of Grease: Rise of the Pink Ladies on streaming service Paramount+.

Awards 
 2011 - When the Wind Changes - Best Short Film, Inside Film (IF) Awards
 2012 - Lemonade Stand - First Prize, Tropfest Short Film Festival
 2017 - Breakthrough Award (joint winner), Australians in Film

Personal life

Jones grew up in Northern New South Wales, Australia and graduated from the Victorian College of Arts in 2007.

She currently resides in Los Angeles with her husband, Emmy-award nominated sound designer PK Hooker.

Filmography (as director)

References

External links 
Official website

Australian directors
Australian women film directors
Australian film directors
Living people
Year of birth missing (living people)